James Connors may refer to:

James Connors (Kiltullagh) (died 1881), Irish tenant farmer, murdered in May 1881
James Connors (Medal of Honor) (1838–?), Irish born Union Army soldier during the American Civil War
James H. Connors (died 1941), American horse racing executive and businessman
Jim Connors, mayor of Scranton, Pennsylvania
Jimmy Connors (born 1952), American tennis player
Jimmy Connors, American welterweight boxer and brother of mobster Edward G. Connors

See also
James Connor (disambiguation)